The 1930 Lafayette Leopards football team was an American football team that represented Lafayette College in the Middle Three Conference during the 1930 college football season. In its seventh season under head coach Herb McCracken, the team compiled a 5–3–1 record. Raymond Woodfin was the team captain.

Schedule

References

Lafayette
Lafayette Leopards football seasons
Lafayette Leopards football